Dr Andrew Commins (1829 – 7 January 1916) was an Irish lawyer and politician.

Andrew Commins was born in Ballybeg, County Carlow and educated at St. Patrick's College, Carlow and Queen's College, Cork where he was awarded an MA in 1854. In 1858 he was awarded an LLD degree from the University of London. He became a barrister at Lincoln's Inn in 1860, working on the Northern Circuit.

In 1876, he was elected as an Irish Home Rule Councillor to Liverpool Town Council to represent the Vauxhall ward which he continued to represent until 1892,  when he was elected as an alderman, a post he continued to hold until his resignation in 1913.

In 1880 he was elected to parliament for Roscommon representing the Home Rule League, then the Irish Parliamentary Party. From 1885 he sat for the new constituency of Roscommon South. In the Parnell split of 1891 he was a member of the majority Anti-Parnellite group, and in the general election of 1892 lost his seat to a Parnellite candidate. In a June 1893 by-election he was returned for South East Cork, and sat as MP for the constituency until the general election of 1900.

Notes

External links

Painting of Andrew Commins in 1876, from National Museums Liverpool

1829 births
1916 deaths
Irish Parliamentary Party MPs
Anti-Parnellite MPs
UK MPs 1880–1885
UK MPs 1885–1886
UK MPs 1886–1892
UK MPs 1892–1895
UK MPs 1895–1900
19th-century Irish lawyers
Alumni of Carlow College
Alumni of University College Cork
People from County Carlow
Members of the Parliament of the United Kingdom for County Roscommon constituencies (1801–1922)
Members of the Parliament of the United Kingdom for County Cork constituencies (1801–1922)
Councillors in Liverpool